ZuluWar! is a 1996 computer wargame published by Incredible Simulations. Designed by Jeff Lapkoff and Dennis Bishop, it simulates the Anglo-Zulu War.

Gameplay
ZuluWar! is a computer wargame that simulates the Anglo-Zulu War from a strategic level. The player may control either the British Empire or Zulu Kingdom.

Development
ZuluWar! was designed by Jeff Lapkoff and Dennis Bishop for Incredible Simulations, a company owned by Lapkoff. It follows the design trend in Lapkoff's earlier work, such as Custer's Last Command and Defend the Alamo, of focusing on losing battles. It was the first computer wargame dedicated to the Anglo-Zulu War released since the 1980s, and Lapkoff's first game developed for Microsoft Windows.

Reception

Computer Gaming World wargame columnist Terry Coleman offered ZuluWar! a positive review. He later the game for his 1996 "Good Things Come in Small Packages" award, highlighting its "nice balance between historicity, play balance, simplicity, and fun."

References

External links
Official page (archived)

1996 video games
Computer wargames
Windows games
Windows-only games
Multiplayer and single-player video games
Turn-based strategy video games
Video games developed in the United States
Video games set in South Africa
Video games set in the 19th century
Works about the Anglo-Zulu War